Tamasha Live is an upcoming Indian Marathi-language drama film written and directed by Sanjay Jadhav. It stars Sonalee Kulkarni and Siddhartha Jadhav and was released theatrically on 15 July 2022.

Cast 
 Sonalee Kulkarni
 Siddhartha Jadhav	
 Nagesh Bhonsle		
 Pushkar Jog
 Sachit Patil	
 Bharat Jadhav

Production 
The film was announced in mid-August 2021, starring Sonalee Kulkarni.

The principal photography of the film started in mid-September 2021. Actor Pushkar Jog announced the wrap of the film schedule on 8 February 2022.

Soundtrack 
The film's music composed by Pankaj Padghan.

Marketing and release 
Official teaser of the film launched on 2 May 2022, on Instagram, and the trailer of the film launched 4 July 2022.

Tamasha Live was scheduled to release theatrically on 24 June 2022 but was pushed to release on 15 July 2022.

Reception

Critical response 
Mihir Bhanage of The Times of India scored the film at 2.5 out of 5 stars and says "Tamasha Live aims to merge news and theatrics to present a current scenario. The film has some clever lines that hit the mark, but it doesn't make the impact that it wants to, ending up being a story with good potential and average execution"Pune Mirror wrote "Overall, the concept and experimentation of the film are exceptional and a positive change of pace, but the direction is so shoddy and lifeless that it ruins the overall experience. Having said that, it is good to see that there is room for experiment within Marathi cinema and one cannot help but laud this risk taken by the cast and crew of Tamasha Live."Suyog Zore of Cinestaan.com scored the film at 2 out of 5 stars and wrote "Overall, the lack of imagination in designing a unique and engaging musical drama ultimately leaves the viewer disappointed"

References

External links 
 

2022 films
2022 drama films
Films directed by Sanjay Jadhav